Nurallao, Nuradda in sardinian language, is a comune (municipality) in the Province of South Sardinia in the Italian region Sardinia, located about  north of Cagliari.

Nurallao borders the following municipalities: Isili, Laconi, Nuragus.

"Giants' tomb" of Aiodda
The site of Aiodda is famous for its Nuragic-age megalithic "Giants' grave".

References

Cities and towns in Sardinia